"Givin' Me a Rush", also called "Give Me a Rush", is a song recorded by Tyra B. for her project Past Due, which was never released as an album. The song peaked at number 36 on Billboard magazine's Hot R&B/Hip-Hop Songs. It contains vocal interpolations of Michael Jackson's "Human Nature", and Paula Abdul's "Rush Rush".

The music video for the single premiered on December 11, 2007.

Charts

References

2007 singles
2007 songs
Warner Records singles
Songs written by Steve Porcaro
Songs written by Michael Jackson